The Fire Next Time is a 1993 American television disaster miniseries directed by Tom McLoughlin and written and produced by James S. Henerson which stars Craig T. Nelson, Bonnie Bedelia, Richard Farnsworth and Justin Whalin. Set in 2017, the plot focuses on a family who, after a series of fires begins to break out due to global warming, must struggle to survive a natural disaster that devastates the Earth.

Cast
 Craig T. Nelson as Drew Morgan
 Bonnie Bedelia as Suzanne Morgan
 Richard Farnsworth as Frank Morgan
 Justin Whalin as Paul Morgan
 Ashley Jones as Linnie Morgan
 Shawn Toovey as Jake Morgan
 Jürgen Prochnow as Larry Richter

Reception
Film critic Rick Sherwood of The Hollywood Reporter wrote in his review: "The Fire Next Time is a small story in a big package, an underworked, underdeveloped and severely underproduced miniseries that might have worked in two hours but fails miserably in four."

Home media
The miniseries became available on DVD on July 21, 2015.

References

External links
 

American television films
1990s American television miniseries
1990s disaster films
1993 television films
1993 films
American disaster films
Disaster television films
Films about families
Films about homelessness
Films set in the future
Environmental television
Climate change in fiction
Climate change mass media
Television series set in 2017
Climate change films
1990s English-language films
1990s American films